The Mississippi Braves, or M-Braves as they are referred to locally, are a Minor League Baseball team based in Pearl, Mississippi, a suburb of Jackson. The team is the Double-A affiliate of the Atlanta Braves and plays in the Southern League. The team is owned and operated by Endeavor. Endeavor purchased the Braves from Liberty Media in 2022.

History
In 2005, the Southern League's Greenville Braves relocated to Pearl from Greenville, South Carolina, due to the poor condition of Greenville Municipal Stadium, and the failure to reach an agreement with the Greenville County council for a new ballpark.

The M-Braves' first season began on April 18, 2005 at Trustmark Park with a loss to the Montgomery Biscuits.

In conjunction with Major League Baseball's restructuring of Minor League Baseball in 2021, the Braves were organized into the Double-A South. They won the 2021 Southern Division title with a first-place 67–44 record. They qualified for the playoffs by having the best record in the league. The Braves defeated the Montgomery Biscuits, 3–2, in the best-of-five series to win the Double-A South championship. Shea Langeliers was selected as the league's Top MLB Prospect and Dan Meyer as the Manager of the Year. In 2022, the Double-A South became known as the Southern League, the name historically used by the regional circuit prior to the 2021 reorganization.

Championships
On September 13, 2008, the Mississippi Braves beat the Carolina Mudcats, 3–2, in the 10th inning of the decisive Game 5 of the Southern League Championship Series. This was the M-Braves first championship and the first Southern League title for Atlanta's Double-A franchise since 1997. The M-Braves' second title came in 2021 in the Double-A South.

Television and radio
All Mississippi Braves games are televised live on MiLB.TV. Beginning with the 2009 season, all regular and post-season Mississippi Braves games air on WYAB 103.9 FM.  The play-by-play broadcaster is Chris Harris.

Roster

Notable players

 Blaine Boyer* (2005)
 Danny Burawa
 Román Colón (2005)
 Chuck James (2005)
 Brian McCann* (2005)
 Jay Powell* (2005)
 Martín Prado* (2005–2006)
 Gregor Blanco (2005-2006)
 Joey Devine* (2005–2007)
 Jeff Francoeur* (2005, 2008)
 Max Fried* (2017)
 Chipper Jones* (2006)
 Yunel Escobar (2006)
 Manny Acosta (2006)
 Matt Harrison (2006)
 José Ascanio* (2006–2007)
 Jarrod Saltalamacchia* (2006–2007)
 Kris Medlen (2007-2008)
 Tommy Hanson (2008)
 Matt Diaz (2008)
 Jordan Schafer (2008, 2010)
 Jason Heyward (2009)
 Freddie Freeman (2009)
 Craig Kimbrel (2009)
 Nate McLouth* (2009)
 Julio Teherán (2010)
 Mike Minor (2010, 2014)
 Arodys Vizcaíno (2011, 2015)
 Andrelton Simmons* (2012)
 Evan Gattis (2012)
 Christian Bethancourt (2012-2013)
 Philip Gosselin (2012-2013)
 Tommy La Stella (2013)
 Alex Wood (2013)
 Mallex Smith (2015)
 Brian O'Connor (2005)
 Ronald Acuna Jr. (2017)
 Michael Harris II (2022)

* Promoted directly to Atlanta.

References

External links

 Official site
 Manager Phillip Wellman's tirade
 
 Mississippi Braves photos

Baseball teams established in 2005
Southern League (1964–present) teams
Professional baseball teams in Mississippi
Atlanta Braves minor league affiliates
2005 establishments in Mississippi
Rankin County, Mississippi
Double-A South teams